Dasho Dawa Dem (May 16, 1944February 15, 2018) was a bureaucrat in the Kingdom of Bhutan. She held positions in various government branches, namely the Royal Secretariat, the Thimphu District Administration, the Ministry of Foreign Affairs, and the Royal Advisory Council, in an official career spanning two decades, from 1965 to 1985. She helped establish the National Women's Association of Bhutan in 1981 was appointed its secretary in 1985. She retired in 2009 and died in 2018.

Early life
Dasho Dawa Dem was born on May 16, 1944, in Takchu Goenpa in Haa District. In Haa, she was one of the first Bhutanese to receive a modern education with her attending school there from 1956 to 1963. She studied further in various Indian schools under a Bhutanese Government scholarship.

Government service
Dawa Dem began her career at the Royal Secretariat in Bhutan on June 1, 1965, as a private secretary. In October 1967, she was promoted to Ramjam (assistant district magistrate/chief executive) in the Thimphu District administration, where she worked till July 1971. In 1971 she was transferred to the newly established Ministry of Foreign Affairs, where she worked as a protocol officer till 1973. She was then promoted to councillor in the now-defunct Royal Advisory Council, a post she held till 1985.

Dawa Dem was the first woman Ramjam in Bhutan. On her appointment as Ramjam in 1967, she was conferred the honorific title Dasho in Thimphu by the Third Druk Gyalpo of Bhutan, Jigme Dorji Wangchuck. Besides being the first woman Ramjam, she was also the first woman to join the Bhutanese civil service and to become Royal Advisory Councillor. She remains one of the few women to have received the title Dasho.

Other activities
While Ramjam, Dawa Dem attended a diploma course in spoken English in Australia in 1971. Later, she attended a course in National Government Administration at the Institute of Public Administration in Japan in 1973.

Dawa Dem helped establish the National Women's Association of Bhutan (NWAB) in 1981. She was appointed its secretary on February 23, 1985, after her tenure as Royal Advisory Councillor. The NWAB is the premier women's association in Bhutan. She retired from NWAB headship in 2009.

Dawa Dem attended the 1985 UN Women's Decade Conference and the 1995 Fourth World Conference on Women.

Death
Dawa Dem died aged 73 on February 15, 2018, at the Jigme Dorji Wangchuck National Referral Hospital in Thimphu. She was cremated on February 26. The Privy Council of Bhutan, in a press release, stated
She will be cherished and remembered by [the] Bhutanese for her selfless dedication and service to the country.

References

1944 births
2018 deaths
People from Haa District
Members of the National Council (Bhutan)